Aeronautical Test Range (ATR), Chitradurga is an out-door testing and evaluation facility set up by DRDO exclusively for unmanned and manned aircraft. The ATR is under the command of the Aeronautical Development Establishment (ADE).

ATR, Chitradurga is located at Varavoo Kaval in Challakere Taluk of Chitradurga district on a 4,290 acre plot.
The land was bought by Ministry of Defence from the state government for Rs.12 crore (Rs.120 million) in a deal negotiated in 2008.
The project was set up with an investment of Rs 1300 Crores.

ATR, Chitradurga has a Range Control Centre (RCC) with air traffic display system. It is equipped with a mission video distribution and display system. It has a Radar Centre which houses primary and secondary surveillance radars. It has two hangars which houses unmanned aerial vehicles Rustom-1 and Rustom-2. The runway is currently 2.2 km long with the capacity to host take off and landing from any end.

The project envisages a runway beside other tracking and control equipments and a rail link to the facility have also been planned.
In 2021, ADE planned to expand the runway from 2.2 km to 3 km and setup a high-power computing facility.

Chitradurga ATR is intended to conduct the trials of unmanned aerial vehicles (UAVs), air-to-ground weapons, parachutes and aerostats. It has been planned not to utilize Challakere ATR for test flight of ballistic missiles.

The Chitradurga ATR was partially activated on 15 December 2010. The facility was formally inaugurated by Union Defence and Finance Minister Arun Jaitley on 28 May 2017.

See also
Pashan Test Range
Ramgarh Test Range
Tandur Test Range

References

Ministry of Defence (India)
Defence Research and Development Organisation
Aviation in India
Military installations of India